Borden (formerly, Alabama Settlement and Arcola) is an unincorporated community in Madera County, California.

The first settlers came from Alabama in 1858, whence its original name. The name Arcola comes from the plantation in Alabama owned by one of the settlers. The current name was bestowed by the railroad for civic leader, Dr. Joseph Borden. The Borden post office operated to 1873, closed for a time in 1896, and closed for good in 1907.

On December 2, 2010, the California High-Speed Rail Authority Board voted to start construction of the first part of the California High-Speed Rail line at Borden and continue it to Corcoran, California.  Construction is expected to begin in 2012.

References

Unincorporated communities in California
Unincorporated communities in Madera County, California